John T. Kretchmer is an American film and television director and television producer.

Biography
Throughout his career, he has amassed a number of television credits, namely Buffy the Vampire Slayer, Lois and Clark: The New Adventures of Superman, Angel,  Charmed, The Twilight Zone, Hercules: The Legendary Journeys, Special Unit 2 (also a producer), Dark Angel, Psych, Burn Notice, Veronica Mars, Star Trek: Deep Space Nine, Star Trek: Voyager, Moonlight, Army Wives, White Collar, Forever, Nancy Drew, Walker, The Winchesters and other series.

Prior to a career in television, Kretchmer worked as an assistant director on a number of films such as The In-Laws (1979), Baby Boom (1987), The Naked Gun: From the Files of Police Squad! (1988) and Jurassic Park (1993).

References

External links

American film directors
American television directors
American television producers
Living people
Place of birth missing (living people)
Year of birth missing (living people)